Methyl-CpG-binding domain protein 2 is a protein that in humans is encoded by the MBD2 gene.

Function 

DNA methylation is the major modification of eukaryotic genomes and plays an essential role in mammalian development. Human proteins MECP2, MBD1, MBD2, MBD3, and MBD4 comprise a family of nuclear proteins related by the presence in each of a methyl-CpG-binding domain (MBD). Each of these proteins, with the exception of MBD3, is capable of binding specifically to methylated DNA. MECP2, MBD1, and MBD2 can also repress transcription from methylated gene promoters. The protein encoded by these genes may function as a mediator of the biological consequences of the methylation signal. It is also reported that MBD2 and MBD3 recruit the NuRD complex to regions of DNA depending on their selective binding of methylated CpG sites. Therefore, MBD2/NuRD and MBD3/NuRD define two distinct protein complexes with different biochemical and functional properties.

Interactions 

Methyl-CpG-binding domain protein 2 has been shown to interact with:

 GATAD2B,
 HDAC1, 
 Histone deacetylase 2, 
 MBD3 
 MIZF,  and
 SIN3A.

References

Further reading 

 
 
 
 
 
 
 
 
 
 
 
 
 
 
 
 
 
 

Human proteins